Aliabad-e Vaziri (also Romanized as ‘Alīābād-e Vazīrī) is a village in Borj-e Akram Rural District, in the Central District of Fahraj County, Kerman Province, Iran. At the 2006 census, its population was 380, in 89 families.

References 

Populated places in Fahraj County